The following is a list of transfers for the 2023 Major League Soccer (MLS) season that have been made during the 2022–23 MLS offseason all the way through to the roster freeze.

Transfers

References 

2023

Major League Soccer